Carl Furlonge (22 November 1932 – 18 December 2015) was a Trinidad cricketer. He played first-class cricket for Trinidad and Tobago between 1952 and 1971.

References

External links
 

1932 births
2015 deaths
Trinidad and Tobago cricketers